Monster Movie is the seventh studio album by The Rainmakers, released in 2014.

Track listing
All tracks written by Bob Walkenhorst except where noted.

 "Shithole Town"
 "Monster Movie"
 "Who's at the Wheel" (Pat Tomek & Bob Walkenhorst)
 "Blue Museum"
 "Miserable"
 "Your Time Has Come"
 "Save Some for Me" (Jeff Porter & Bob Walkenhorst)
 "Believe in Now" (Jeff Porter)
 "13th Spirit"
 "Dogleg" (Rich Ruth & Bob Walkenhorst)
 "Signs of a Struggle"
 "Swinging Shed"

Personnel
The Rainmakers
Bob Walkenhorst – lead vocals, guitar
Rich Ruth – bass guitar, vocals
Pat Tomek – drums
Jeff Porter – guitar, piano, vocals

References 

2014 albums
The Rainmakers (band) albums